The  Anthony Theater, located at 220 W. Main St. in Anthony, Kansas, is an Art Deco-style theater built in 1936.  It was listed on the National Register of Historic Places in 1991.

It was designed by architect S.S. Voigt. It is a two-story building with white concrete, buff brick, and copper brown tiles.

References

Theatres on the National Register of Historic Places in Kansas
Art Deco architecture in Kansas
Buildings and structures completed in 1936
Harper County, Kansas